Palaeocoma is an extinct genus of brittle stars that lived during the Middle Triassic to Early Jurassic Periods. Its fossils have been found in Europe.

Distribution
The genus Palaeocoma was revised by Hess (1960, 1962) and is known from the Middle Triassic (Ladinian) to the Lower Jurassic (Toarcian) with occurrences reported from the United Kingdom (Hess, 1964; Kutscher, 1996), France (Thuy, 2011; Thuy et al., 2011), Luxembourg (Kutscher & Hary, 1991), Germany (Kutscher, 1988), Switzerland (Hess, 1960, 1962), Italy (Pinna, 1985), and Serbia and Montenegro (Bachmayer & Kollmann, 1968).

Type species
Palaeocoma milleri (Phillips, 1829) [= P. gaveyi and P. egertoni according to Jaselli (2015, p. 192)], an Early Jurassic (Sinemurian and Pliensbachian) species recorded from France, Germany, Luxembourg, the United Kingdom and Lombardy in Italy.

Synonymised names
Ophioderma carinata Wright, 1866 
Ophioderma egertoni (Broderip, 1840)
Ophioderma gaveyi Wright, 1854
Ophioderma milleri (Phillips, 1829)
Ophiura egertoni Broderip, 1840
Ophiura milleri Phillips, 1829
Ophiurella milleri (Phillips, 1829)
Palaeocoma egertoni (Broderip, 1840)
Palaeocoma gaveyi (Wright, 1854)

Other species 
It occurs in the Hettangian, the earliest age and lowest stage of the Jurassic period and, specifically, the Psiloceras planorbis Ammonite Zone.
Palaeocoma raiblana (Toula, 1887). This species is only found in the Triassic Wengener Schichten Formation (Ladinian) of Budva in Serbia and Montenegro).

Gallery

References 

Ophiuroidea genera
Prehistoric Asterozoa genera
Jurassic echinoderms
Triassic echinoderms
Prehistoric echinoderms of Europe